The San José de Gracia Formation is a geologic formation in Mexico. It preserves fossils dating back to the Cambrian period.

See also

 List of fossiliferous stratigraphic units in Mexico

References
 

Cambrian Mexico